Child sexual abuse in Nigeria is an offence under several sections of chapter 21 of the country's criminal code. The age of consent is 18.

UNICEF reported in 2015 that one in four girls and one in ten boys in Nigeria had experienced sexual violence before the age of 18. According to a survey by Positive Action for Treatment Access, over 31.4 percent of girls there said that their first sexual encounter had been rape or forced sex of some kind.

The Centre for Environment, Human Rights and Development reported that 1,200 girls had been raped in 2012 in Rivers, a coastal state in southeastern Nigeria.

According to UNICEF, six out of ten children in Nigeria experience emotional, physical or sexual abuse before the age of 18, with half experiencing physical violence.

Girl child
Conditions that increase the risk of girl-child sexual assault in Nigeria can be found in schools, baby factories and the practice of child labour. Studies conducted in Nigeria disclose that young girls are victims in majority of reported assault cases in hospitals. A four-year review of sexual assault cases at LASUTH that began in 2008 and ended in December 2012, showed that out of a total 287 reported cases of sexual assault, 83% of the victims were below the age of 19. A one-year survey conducted at Enugu State University Teaching Hospital between 2012 and 2013 revealed that 70% of sexual assault victims were under the age of 18. In the Enugu survey, majority of the victims knew their perpetrators and the assault occurred inside uncompleted buildings and the victims or perpetrators residence.

Child labour
One of the traditional means of socialization of children is through trading. However, the introduction of young girls into street trading increases the vulnerabilities of the girls to sexual harassment. Sexual abuse of young girls in Nigeria is linked to child labour.

Baby factories
Religious and communal stigma associated with surrogacy and adoption has created a rise in baby factories in Nigeria. A large number of female victims in the baby factories are young adolescents. Operators of the baby factories mostly prey on pregnant young girls who are from lower income households, unmarried and are afraid of the public stigma associated with teenage pregnancy. Though, majority of the girls who enter the factory are pregnant some of girls in the factories were kidnapped or bartered to the operators. These girls are then raped solely for the purpose of procreation.

Poor parenting

Poverty and inaccessible to funds for parents to take care of their wards has contributed to child sexual abuse.

See also

Child marriage in Nigeria
Ages of consent in Africa
Paternity fraud in Nigeria
Crime in Nigeria
Child labour in Nigeria
Girl child labour in Nigeria
Female genital mutilation in Nigeria

References

Sources

Further reading
 
Nigeria Demographic and Health Survey, 2013, Abuja, Nigeria, and Rockville, MD, United States: NPC and ICF International, June 2014.

Children's rights in Nigeria
Crimes against children
Harassment
Rape in Nigeria
Violent crime
Sex crimes in Nigeria